Jacob Trieber (October 6, 1853 – September 17, 1927) was a United States district judge of the United States District Court for the Eastern District of Arkansas.

Education and career

Born on October 6, 1853, in Raschkow, German Confederation (now Raszków, Poland), Trieber was the United States Attorney for the Eastern District of Arkansas from 1897 to 1900.

Federal judicial service

Trieber received a recess appointment from President William McKinley on July 26, 1900, to a seat on the United States District Court for the Eastern District of Arkansas vacated by Judge John A. Williams. He was nominated to the same position by President McKinley on December 4, 1900. He was confirmed by the United States Senate on January 9, 1901, and received his commission the same day. His service terminated due to his death at his daughter's home in Scarsdale, New York on September 17, 1927.
During his tenure, Judge Trieber heard civil rights cases, and became unpopular in the white community for holding that federal law permitted protection of African Americans. Trieber was the first Jewish person to serve as a United States federal judge.

Honor

In 2016, the federal courthouse in Helena–West Helena, Arkansas was renamed in Trieber's honor.

See also
List of first minority male lawyers and judges in the United States

References

Sources
 

1853 births
1927 deaths
American Jews
United States Attorneys for the Eastern District of Arkansas
Judges of the United States District Court for the Eastern District of Arkansas
United States federal judges appointed by William McKinley
German emigrants to the United States